Joshua Lutrail Johnson (born September 10, 1990) is an American professional Canadian football cornerback for the Winnipeg Blue Bombers of the Canadian Football League (CFL). He played college football at Purdue University.

High school career
Johnson attended Pasco High School in Dade City, Florida. He was a first-team All-Sun Coast and All-Sunshine Athletic Conference after catching 32 passes for 466 yards (14.6 average) and nine touchdowns and rushing for 204 yards on 39 carries (5.2 average) as senior helping his team advance to the state semifinals. He also played baseball and was named one of the top 100 juniors in the nation after leading the Tampa Bay area in home runs.

Considered a two-star recruit by Rivals.com, he accepted a scholarship to Purdue over an offer from Vanderbilt.

College career
During his tenure, he started 36 of 49 games, where he accumulated 184 tackles (149 solo), including 7.5 for a loss, 31 pass break ups and six interceptions. He was twice named Academic All-Big Ten and was an all conference honorable mention as a senior.

Professional career

San Diego Chargers
Johnson went undrafted during the 2013 NFL Draft, but signed with the San Diego Chargers after the draft ended.

BC Lions
Johnson played for the BC Lions of the Canadian Football League from 2014 to 2015.

Jacksonville Jaguars
Johnson signed with the Jacksonville Jaguars on February 12, 2016. On August 14, 2017, Johnson was waived/injured by the Jaguars and placed on injured reserve. He was released on October 10, 2017.

Ottawa Redblacks 
Josh Johnson signed with the Ottawa Redblacks of the Canadian Football League (CFL) on March 14, 2018. He was released on July 17, 2018.

Hamilton Tiger-Cats
On August 19, 2018, Johnson signed with the Hamilton Tiger-Cats.

Edmonton Eskimos
Johnson was signed by the Eskimos as a free agent on May 17, 2019.

Winnipeg Blue Bombers
Johnson signed a one-year contract extension with the Winnipeg Blue Bombers on January 15, 2021.

References

External links
Purdue Boilermakers Bio 
BC lions bio
CFL stats

1990 births
Living people
African-American players of American football
African-American players of Canadian football
American football cornerbacks
BC Lions players
Canadian football defensive backs
Hamilton Tiger-Cats players
Jacksonville Jaguars players
Ottawa Redblacks players
People from Dade City, Florida
Players of American football from Florida
Purdue Boilermakers football players
San Diego Chargers players
Sportspeople from the Tampa Bay area
Pasco High School (Florida) alumni
Winnipeg Blue Bombers players
21st-century African-American sportspeople